Secret Orchards is a 1979 TV movie directed by Richard Loncraine. The film is based on the memoirs My Father and Myself (1968) by J. R. Ackerley and his half-sister Diana Petre's Secret Orchard (1975). Their father, Roger Ackerley, had had two families for more than 20 years. He married J. R. Ackerley's mother years after their three children were born, as well as after his three daughters with Muriel Perry (including Sally Grosvenor, Duchess of Westminster) were born.

References 

1979 films
Films based on biographies
British LGBT-related television films
Films directed by Richard Loncraine
1970s British films